Rho guanine nucleotide exchange factor 5 is a protein that in humans is encoded by the ARHGEF5 gene.

Rho GTPases play a fundamental role in numerous cellular processes initiated by extracellular stimuli that work through G protein-coupled receptors. The encoded protein may form a complex with G proteins and stimulate Rho-dependent signals. This protein may be involved in the control of cytoskeletal organization.

References

External links

Further reading